William Stanley (18 October 1640 – 25 October 1670) of Knowsley, Lancashire was an English politician who sat in the House of Commons from 1660 to 1670.
 
Stanley was the 3rd surviving son of James Stanley, 7th Earl of Derby and educated privately.

In April 1660, he was elected Member of Parliament for Liverpool in the Convention Parliament. He was active in the restoration of Charles II of England.

In 1661, he was re-elected MP for Liverpool for the Cavalier Parliament and in 1662 elected Mayor of Liverpool.

He died unmarried and was buried in the Derby chapel of Church of St Peter and St Paul, Ormskirk.

References

1640 births
1670 deaths
William
Cavaliers
English MPs 1660
English MPs 1661–1679
Mayors of Liverpool
Deputy Lieutenants of Lancashire
Deputy Lieutenants of Cheshire
Members of the Parliament of England (pre-1707) for Liverpool
Younger sons of earls